Bebearia baueri is a butterfly in the family Nymphalidae. It is found in the Republic of the Congo, Gabon and southern Cameroon.

References

Butterflies described in 2000
barombina